Simon Hendrik van Dorp (born 10 April 1997) is a Dutch rower. He is an Olympic finalist and won a medal at the 2019 World Rowing Championships.

University
van Dorp attended the University of Washington from 2017 to 2020 where he majored in Political Economy. In 2020 van Dorp took a year off University to train with the Dutch Olympic Team for the 2020 Summer Olympics, Tokyo.

2017 (Freshman)
In 2017, van Dorp's Freshman Year at the University of Washington, he rowed in the Men's Varsity 8+ that won the Oregon State Classic; won the Stanford Invitational against the University of Wisconsin-Madison and Stanford University; won the Schoch Cup against University of California, Berkeley and won the Windermere Cup. In the Men's Varsity 8+ he also won the Pac-12 Championships and finished second in the grand final at the Intercollegiate Rowing Association (IRA) Regatta.

2018 (Sophomore)
In his sophomore year, van Dorp rowed in the UW Varsity 8+ and 2nd Varsity 8+. He was in the Varsity 8+ which beat Dartmouth College at the Las Vegas Invitational, also beating Santa Clara University and Gonzaga University. van Dorp was also in the Varsity crew which had match race wins over Stanford University and Oregon State University. He rowed the Second Varsity 8+ which was victorious at California and won the national championship at IRAs. He rowed in the Varsity 8+ which beat UBC & Oxford Brookes in the Windermere Cup and won Pac-12 Championships. On February 20, 2018, van Dorp pulled an 18:13.2 (1:31/500m) 6k erg time, giving him the world record for the distance.

2019 (Junior)
In 2019, van Dorp won the program's Pigott Award as the most inspirational member of the team. He rowed in the UW Second Varsity 8+ which won its event at the 2018 Head of the Lake. He rowed in the Varsity 8+ which won races against Cornell, Marist and Oregon State at the Lake Las Vegas Invitational; beat Northeastern, Stanford and Oregon State at Redwood Shores; beat California for the Schoch Cup; won the Windermere Cup on Opening Day and earned the silver medal at IRAs. He rowed in the Second Varsity 8+ that won the Pac-12 Championship.

2020 (Senior)
van Dorp took the 2019–20 school year off to train for the 2020 Olympic Games.

References

External links

1997 births
Living people
Dutch male rowers
World Rowing Championships medalists for the Netherlands
Olympic rowers of the Netherlands
Rowers at the 2020 Summer Olympics
20th-century Dutch people
21st-century Dutch people